Watercolors is a 2008 American film directed by David Oliveras and starring Tye Olson, Kyle Clare, Greg Louganis and Karen Black. It was produced by Larry Allen and Penny Styles McLean. The script was written by Oliveras.

Plot
Shy, closeted and nerdy young artist Danny (Tye Olson) is befriended by golden boy swimming champion Carter (Kyle Clare) when family circumstances bring them together for a night. Danny helps the troubled Carter in school, while the brash and sexy yet troubled Carter works hard to hide his drug problems, history of seizures and the painful relationship he has with his unsympathetic, recovering alcoholic father. Their blossoming relationship brings Danny out of his shell, awakening both his passion for art and burgeoning gay sexuality.

Watercolors is framed by scenes of Danny as an adult. He's a successful artist, but his boyfriend is bothered that he can't seem to get over his high school first love. He argues that a live person can't compete with a glorified memory, showing that the lasting memory of a first love is potentially toxic.

Cast
Tye Olson as Danny Wheeler
Kyle Clare as Carter Melman
Ellie Araiza as Andy
Greg Louganis as Coach Brown
Karen Black as Mrs. Martin
Casey Kramer as Miriam
William Charles Mitchell as Mr. Frank
Ian Rhodes as Older Danny
Edward Finlay as Allan
David Schroeder as High School Principal
Bobby Quinn Rice as Donnert

Screenings and awards
2008 Outfest in Los Angeles winning Audience Award winning:
Audience Award - "Outstanding First Dramatic Feature" for "Watercolors"
Jury Award - "Best Actor" for Tye Olson
2008 Tampa International Gay and Lesbian Film Festival winning:
Jury Award - "Best Actor" for Tye Olson
Audience Award - "Best Supporting Actor" for Kyle Clare
Audience Award - "Best Director" for David Oliveras 
New York Times critic Neil Genzlinger reviewed the movie was being "modest" and deals "unblinkingly with gay bashing among high school students..."
Screenings
The film was also shown in the 2008 San Francisco Frameline Film Festival

References

External links
 
 

2008 films
American LGBT-related films
American coming-of-age films
2008 LGBT-related films
2008 directorial debut films
LGBT-related coming-of-age films
2000s English-language films
2000s American films